Prince Ahmad Mirza Azd es-Saltaneh (1891-1939), was the last son of Nasser al-Din Shah and princess Turan es-Saltaneh and full brother of Zahra Khanom Tadj es-Saltaneh. He studied Military at Theresianum in Austria, with his brother Yamin ed-Dowleh. During Azd es-Saltaneh and Yamin ed-Dowleh stay in Austria, Franz Joseph I generously received the brothers of Shah and several times invited them to his palace. 
In 1913, when Mohammad Hassan Mirza lived in Tabriz, Prince Azd es-Saltaneh was the Military commander of Azerbaijan. Ahmad Mirza did not have any children. He died in 1939 and buried in Qom.

References

 Moayer-ol-Mamalek, Dustali (1982). Rejale Asre Nassery.

1891 births
1939 deaths
Qajar princes